Fueled by Ramen LLC is an American record label owned by Warner Music Group and distributed by 300 Elektra Entertainment. The label, founded in Gainesville, Florida in 1996, is now based in New York City.

History
John Janick conceived of the label while attending high school, but it was not until he enrolled at the University of Florida in Gainesville and teamed up with Less Than Jake drummer-lyricist Vinnie Fiorello that Fueled By Ramen became a reality. The name of the label was inspired by only being able to afford a diet of inexpensive instant ramen at the time, due to having invested most of their money into making records.

Ramen's first major success came in 1998 with the self-titled EP from Jimmy Eat World, which enabled the label to buy its first office space in Tampa.

Ramen early on partnered with the independent distribution arm of Warner, ADA; Warner's Lyor Cohen finally making a deal for Ramen that led Janick to say "We operate like an indie label that’s very small and nimble and can do their own thing, but we have the resources of a major company."

In 2004, Fall Out Boy's Pete Wentz introduced Fueled By Ramen to fellow Chicago pop-rock outfit The Academy Is..., who released their debut album Almost Here, the following year. Soon thereafter, Janick joined forces with Wentz to create Decaydance Records and released a series of albums from a disparate-sounding group of acts ranging from the alternative hip hop of Gym Class Heroes to the indie-pop combo The Hush Sound. In September 2005, Decaydance and Fueled By Ramen released A Fever You Can't Sweat Out, the RIAA triple-platinum-certified debut album from Las Vegas' Panic! at the Disco.

In 2006, Vinnie Fiorello left the label, citing disagreements in the direction of future signees and loss of passion in the music the label was investing itself in.

In 2007, the label opened an office in midtown Manhattan, and that same year Paramore's album Riot! debuted in the top 20 of the U.S. Billboard 200, was certified gold and a year later gained platinum status. Panic! at the Disco's second studio album Pretty. Odd. achieved similar success, debuting at number 2 on the Billboard 200 charts, selling over 139,000 copies in its first week, and gaining platinum success. Later in 2016, Panic! at the Disco's fifth studio album Death of a Bachelor debuted at number 1, selling 196,000 copies in its first week, making it the fastest-selling album in the label's history.

In 2012, Fueled By Ramen signed musical duo Twenty One Pilots. They released their label debut album Vessel in 2013, which included songs, "Ode to Sleep", "Holding on to You", "House of Gold", and "Car Radio". In 2015, they released their breakthrough studio album Blurryface, which included singles, "Tear in My Heart", "Fairly Local", "Stressed Out", "Heavydirtysoul" and "Ride". The album peaked at number 1 on the US Billboard Top 200 charts, and was certified quintuple platinum after selling over 5 million copies in the U.S. alone. "Stressed Out" is the most viewed music video on Fueled by Ramen's YouTube channel, accumulating over 2.5 billion views as of August 2022.

In June 2018, Warner Music Group announced that Fueled by Ramen, amongst other labels, would be included in a new parent label, Elektra Music Group. It officially launched on October 1, 2018. In June 2022, Elektra Music Group, and subsequently Fueled by Ramen, was merged into the new umbrella label group 300 Elektra Entertainment.

Award certifications
Twelve albums released by Fueled By Ramen have been certified Platinum (some multiple times) by the Recording Industry Association of America for sales of one million units or more:
 Some Nights (2012) by fun.
 A Fever You Can't Sweat Out (2005), Pretty. Odd. (2008), Too Weird to Live, Too Rare to Die! (2013), Death of a Bachelor (2016), and Pray for the Wicked (2018) by Panic! at the Disco
 Riot! (2007), Brand New Eyes (2009), and Paramore (2013) by Paramore
 Vessel (2013), Blurryface (2015), and Trench (2018) by Twenty One Pilots.

Blurryface, the label's highest selling-album, was certified quintuple platinum for sales of at least five million units; Some Nights, A Fever You Can't Sweat Out, and Riot! were certified triple platinum for sales of at least three million units; and Death of a Bachelor and Vessel were certified double platinum for sales of at least two million units.

Artists signed to Fueled by Ramen
This list was compiled based on information found on the Elektra Music webpage for Fueled by Ramen and the label's discography.

Active artists 

 A Day to Remember
 All Time Low
 Arizona
 Chloe Moriondo
 Fall Out Boy
 Flor
 The Front Bottoms
 Games We Play
 Grandson
 Lights
 Meet Me at the Altar
 Nate Ruess
 Nothing,Nowhere
 One OK Rock
 Quinton Griggs
 The Blssm
 Twenty One Pilots
 Waterparks

Alumni 

3OH!3
 The A.K.A.s
 The Academy Is...
 Against the Current
 Ann Beretta
 Autopilot Off
 August Premier
 Basement
 Bigwig
 The Cab
 Chef'Special
 Cute Is What We Aim For
 Dashboard Confessional
 E^ST 
 Foundation
 Ghost Town
 The Hush Sound
 The Impossibles
 Jimmy Eat World
 Less Than Jake
 Lifetime
 MisterWives
 Outcried Dilemma
 Paramore
 Phantom Planet
 The Pietasters
 Punchline
 Rome
 Slick Shoes
 Sublime with Rome
 SWMRS
 Travie McCoy
 WhoHurtYou
 Yonaka
 Young the Giant

Inactive artists 

 the20goto10
 Animal Chin
 Apocalypse Hoboken
 Blueline Medic
 Boxcar
 Cadillac Blindside
 Cobra Starship
 The Causey Way
 Days Away
 Discount
 Forgive Durden
 Frodus
 Fun
 Fun Size
 Gym Class Heroes
 The Hippos
 Home Grown
 The Impossibles
 Jersey
 Kane Hodder
 Kissing Chaos
 Limp
 Mid Carson July
 October Fall
 Oh Honey
 Panic! at the Disco
 Pollen
 Powerspace
 This Providence
 Rhythm Collision
 A Rocket to the Moon
 Roy
 Recover
 Shower With Goats
 Slowreader
 The Stereo
 Supaflies
 Supermarket All-Stars
 Swank
 The Swellers
 Teen Idols
 VersaEmerge
 Vinyl Theatre
 Whippersnapper
 Yellowcard
 The Æffect

See also
 List of record labels
 Fueled by Ramen discography

References

External links
 
 
 

American record labels
Culture of Tampa, Florida
Record labels established in 1996
Alternative rock record labels
Warner Music labels
Companies based in New York City
Labels distributed by Warner Music Group
1996 establishments in Florida